Anthene lycaenolus is a butterfly in the family Lycaenidae. It is found on the Talaud Islands in Indonesia.

References

Butterflies described in 1966
Anthene
Endemic fauna of Indonesia